Crataegus arcana, the Carolina Hawthorn, is a rare and poorly known species of hawthorn in the rose family. It grows as a shrub or tree and is endemic to the eastern United States in North America. It is thought to be allied with series Pruinosae.

Distribution
Crataegus arcana is found in Michigan, New York, North Carolina, and West Virginia.

References

arcana
Endemic flora of the United States
Trees of the Eastern United States
Plants described in 1902
Flora without expected TNC conservation status